Old Land is a Relativity Records 1985 compilation album by Cluster and Brian Eno. All of the tracks had been previously released on two prior albums: Cluster & Eno and After the Heat, which were released on LP by Sky Records in 1977 and 1978, respectively. The title is drawn from a track originally released on After the Heat.

Track listing
 "Base and Apex" – 4:29
 "Broken Head" – 5:25
 "The Belldog" – 6:16
 "Tzima N'Arki" – 4:30
 "Schöne Hände" – 3:03
 "Steinsame" – 4:06
 "Wehrmut" – 3:20
 "Für Luise" – 5:04
 "Old Land" – 4:10
Tracks 5-8 from Cluster & Eno, others from After the Heat

Personnel 
 Brian Eno – vocals, bass guitar, synthesizers, keyboards
 Dieter Moebius – synthesizers, keyboards
 Hans-Joachim Roedelius – synthesizers, keyboards
 Holger Czukay – bass guitar on "Tzima N'arki"

References

External links
Amazon.com Old Land  Retrieved September 11, 2007.

1985 compilation albums
Cluster (band) albums
Brian Eno compilation albums